Ein Bokek is a hotel and resort district on the Israeli shore of the Dead Sea, near Neve Zohar. It is under the jurisdiction of the Tamar Regional Council.

History 
Archaeological findings at Ein Bokek include the ruins of Metzad Bokek (Arabic: Qasr Umm Baghaq), a small Roman-era fortress commanding the main road, and the remains of an ancient partly reconstructed perfume and medicine factory. The Bokek Stream, for which the district is named, is a canyon-like gorge with water springs and unique fauna and flora.

The first hotel was built in 1960. In 2000, fourteen hotels were operating in Ein Bokek, offering various types of spas and Dead Sea health treatments.

The Zohar Hot Springs (Hamei Zohar) are located three kilometers south of Ein Bokek. Rich in sulphur, the water is believed to be particularly beneficial in the treatment of muscular ailments, diseases of the joints and allergies.

The world's lowest installed ATM is at Ein Bokek; it was installed independently by a grocery store at 421 metres (1381 feet) below sea level.

Panorama

See also 
Tourism in Israel

References

External links 

Ein Bokek Guide at Fodor's

Archaeological sites in Israel
Buildings and structures in Southern District (Israel)
Dead Sea
Destination spas
Populated coastal places in Israel
Resorts in Israel
Seaside resorts
Tamar Regional Council
Tourist attractions in Southern District (Israel)